Brachiacantha illustris is a species in the family Coccinellidae ("lady beetles"), in the order Coleoptera ("beetles").

Brachiacantha illustris is found in North America.

References

Further reading
 American Beetles, Volume II: Polyphaga: Scarabaeoidea through Curculionoidea, Arnett, R.H. Jr., M. C. Thomas, P. E. Skelley and J. H. Frank. (eds.). 2002. CRC Press LLC, Boca Raton, FL.
 American Insects: A Handbook of the Insects of America North of Mexico, Ross H. Arnett. 2000. CRC Press.
 Gordon, Robert D. (1985). The Coccinellidae (Coleoptera) of America North of Mexico. Journal of the New York Entomological Society, vol. 93, no. 1, 1–912.
 Peterson Field Guides: Beetles, Richard E. White. 1983. Houghton Mifflin Company.
 The Coccinellidae (Coleoptera) of America North of Mexico, Robert D. Gordon. 1985. Journal of the New York Entomological Society, Vol. 93, No. 1.

Coccinellidae
Beetles described in 1899